The 2019–20 CONCACAF Nations League C was the third and lowest division of the 2019–20 edition of the CONCACAF Nations League, the inaugural season of the international football competition involving the men's national teams of the 41 member associations of CONCACAF.

Format
League C consisted of thirteen teams: the teams from qualifying which finished from 23rd to 34th, along with Guatemala, who were suspended at the deadline to enter qualifying. The league was split into four groups, with three groups of three teams and one group of four teams. The teams competed in a home-and-away, round-robin format over the course of the group phase, with matches played in the official FIFA match windows in September, October and November 2019. The four group winners were promoted to League B for the next edition of the tournament.

In September 2019, it was announced that the Nations League would also provide qualification for the 2021 CONCACAF Gold Cup. The winners of each of the four League C groups entered the first round of Gold Cup qualification.

Seeding
Teams were seeded into the pots of League C according to their position in the November 2018 CONCACAF Ranking Index.

The draw for the group phase took place at The Chelsea in Las Vegas, Nevada, United States on 27 March 2019, 22:00 EDT (19:00 local time, PDT).

Groups
The fixture list was confirmed by CONCACAF on 21 May 2019.

Times are EDT/EST, as listed by CONCACAF (local times, if different, are in parentheses).

Group A

Group B

Group C

Group D

Goalscorers

Notes

References

External links

League C